Laura Redden Searing (born February 9, 1839, in Somerset County, Maryland) was a deaf poet and journalist.  Her first book of poetry published was Idyls of Battle, and Poems of the Rebellion (1864). She also wrote under the male pseudonym Howard Glyndon. Significantly, the town of Glyndon, Minnesota was founded in 1872 and named in honor of the writer.

Early years

Laura Catherine Redden was born to Littleton John Redden and Wilhelmina Waller Redden in 1839. Her supportive parents learned sign language so they could communicate with her. In 1851, she lost her hearing at age 11 due to the illness spinal meningitis. In 1855, she enrolled in the Missouri School for the Deaf (MSD) in Fulton, Missouri. She learned sign language and the American Manual Alphabet.

Personal life
Laura Catherine Redden graduated from the Missouri School for the Deaf, a secondary school, in 1858. She did not enroll in college.  Her literary skills and unmarried status made it acceptable at the time for her to enroll at certain colleges. However, there were no colleges that accepted deaf women. The National Deaf-Mute College (now Gallaudet University) was established in 1864 and did not admit female students until 1881. To supplement her education, she toured Europe from 1865 to 1869. While there, she studied German, French, Spanish, and Italian. She became engaged to Michael George Brennan in 1867, but the engagement ended shortly after. Laura Catherine Redden married Edward Whelan Searing, a lawyer, in 1876, to become Laura Catherine Redden Searing. They had one child, Elsa Waller Searing, on May 4, 1880. In 1887, Laura Redden Searing and her daughter settled near Santa Cruz, California. Edward Searing stayed in New York and they divorced in 1894. Redden Searing died in 1923 and was buried in Colma, California.

Professional career

From 1857 to 1858, Redden submitted poems to Harper's Magazine.  In 1858, Redden's  first published essay appeared in the American Annals of the Deaf. The topics of the essay were deafness, sign language, and writing.  In 1858, Redden graduated from the Missouri School for the Deaf. Upon graduation, she was offered a teaching position at MSD which she declined.  In 1859, the St. Louis Presbyterian hired her as a columnist and assistant editor. In 1860, she became an editorialist for the St. Louis Republican. At this time, Laura Catherine Redden officially adopted the pseudonym Howard Glyndon.  In 1861, she was sent by the St. Louis Republican to Washington D.C. to cover and document the American Civil War. She also wrote for the US Department of Agriculture on citrus cultivation. She was a pro-Union loyalist and wrote poems about the experiences and human interests of the battle field. She also wrote to Abraham Lincoln and Ulysses S. Grant during the war. After the war, 1865–69, she traveled to Europe to become a correspondent for The New York Times. By 1870, she returned to New York and Boston and was a staff writer for the New York Evening Mail and contributed to Galaxy, Harper's Magazine, and the Tribune.

Background of “Howard Glyndon”
Some speculate Laura Redden Searing used the pen name Howard Glyndon due to the gender biased national attention given to male writers of the time. The name was officially adopted during the American Civil War as a correspondent for the St. Louis Republican. This brings up the possibility that the pen name disassociated her identity from critics to her Union Army sympathies.  However, in all of her published works, the pseudonym was accompanied by her real name in smaller letters. This indicates that the pseudonym was not to conceal her gender or identity.  It is likely that the double identity was to defy the expectations of what a female writer of that era could produce.

Bibliography
(1862) Notable men in the House: A series of sketches of prominent men in the House of Representatives, Members of the Thirty-Seventh Congress
(1864) Idyls of Battle and Poems of the Rebellion
(1869) A Little Boy's Story
(1874) Sounds from Secret Chambers
(1878) Echoes of Other Days
(1897) Of El Dorado

Notes

Further reading
*

References
Glyndon, H., Jones, J.Y., Vallier, J.E.: Sweet Bells Jangled, Gallaudet University Press, 2003
Krentz, C.: A Mighty Change, Gallaudet University Press, 2000
Moulton, C.W.: "Laura C.R. Searing",  The Magazine For Poetry, (6)1:179
Panara, R.F.: "The Civil War Correspondent and Poet (1860-1880)", The Deaf Writer in America from Colonial Times to 1970

Books

External links
 
SHSMO-Columbia--Searing, Laura Redden (1839-1923), Papers, 1846-1963 (C2290)--INVENTORY at shs.umsystem.edu Searing, Laura Redden (1839–1923), Papers, 1846-1963 (C2290).
 The Magazine of Poetry (6) 1: Laura C.R. Searing, p. 179.
 The Deaf Writer in America From Colonial Times to 1970, By Robert F. Panara, M.A., Rochester, NY.
 Idyls of Battle and Poems of the Rebellion by Howard Glyndon (Laura Redden Searing).

1839 births
1923 deaths
Deaf poets
American women poets
American women journalists
American deaf people